Minotaur Pass is a pass, or saddle, at about  between Apollo Peak and Mount Electra in the Olympus Range, Victoria Land, Antarctica. The pass permits walking access to Wright Valley from McKelvey Valley. It was named by the New Zealand Antarctic Place-Names Committee in 1984 after the Minotaur, in association with other names from Greek mythology in the Olympus Range.

References

Mountain passes of Victoria Land
McMurdo Dry Valleys